Finnish paganism is the indigenous pagan religion in Finland and Karelia prior to Christianisation. It was a polytheistic religion, worshipping a number of different deities. The principal god was the god of thunder and the sky, Ukko; other important gods included Jumo (Jumala), Ahti, and Tapio. Jumala was a sky god; today, the word "Jumala" refers to all gods in general. Ahti was a god of the sea, waters and fish. Tapio was the god of forests and hunting.

Finnish paganism shows many similarities with the religious practices of related cultures, such as Estonian, Mordvin, Mari, Sami and other Eurasian paganism. It shares some features with its neighbouring Baltic, Norse and Germanic paganisms.

The organic tradition was sidelined due to Christianization starting from ca. 12th century and finally broken by the early 20th century, when folk magic and oral traditions went extinct. Finnish paganism provided the inspiration for a contemporary pagan movement Suomenusko (Finnish: Finnish faith), which is an attempt to reconstruct the old religion of the Finns. It is nevertheless based on secondary sources.

Deities

The Finnish pagans were polytheistic, believing in a number of different deities. Most of the deities ruled over a specific aspect of nature; for instance, Ukko was the god of the sky and thunder (ukkonen and ukonilma ("Ukko's air") are still used in modern Finnish as terms for thunderstorms). These deities were often pan-Finnic, being worshipped by many different tribes in different regions. The Finnish pagans were also animists, worshipping local nature deities at site-specific shrines to that particular deity. These shrines are thought to be mainly "tree-gods": wooden statues or carvings done in trees or treestumps, depicting human figures, and have been scarcely preserved. One confirmed Stone Age wooden statue has been found in Pohjankuru, and folklore about worshipping tree-gods has been documented. Another kind of shrine are "cup-stones" (Finnish: :fi:kuppikivi), large natural stones into which cup-sized recesses have been drilled. Votive offerings of food or drink were left into these cups. Despite Christianization, offerings on these cup-stones continued up to the early 20th century.

Major deities
Several key deities were venerated across nearly all of Finland and Karelia. These pan-Finnic deities controlled many aspects of nature. 
 The chief god was Ukko (also (thought to be) known as Perkele), who was the ruler over the sky and thunder. A corresponding figure is known in countless other cultures of the world. 
 Another deity that appeared very significant to the Finnish pagans, but about whom modern scholars know very little, was Jumi, whose name is related to "Jumala", the modern Finnish language word for a monotheist God.
 There were many other important deities who ruled over a specific aspect of the natural world, and who have been referred to as "kings". The king of water was often called Ahti, and the king of the forest was Tapio.
 Other major deities included Äkräs, the god of fertility; Mielikki, the goddess of the forests and the hunt; Kuu, the goddess of the moon; and Lempo, the god of wilderness and archery.
 Great heroes, who had, in mythology, once been human, such as Väinämöinen and Ilmarinen, were also objects of worship, in a way similar to the Greek pagans' worship of mythical human heroes like Herakles.

Haltija 

Local animistic deities, known as haltijas or haltias, were also worshipped. These haltijas could be male or female, and could take a human or another animal's form. Haltijas could be found everywhere in nature, both in the biotic and abiotic parts. Every human has a haltija, usually called haltijasielu (haltija soul) or luontohaltija (nature haltija), which is one of the three parts of a person's soul. The tradition blends with the Swedish tomte: the Finnish tonttu was a being analogous to haltija, but which lives in a building, like a home (kotitonttu) or a sauna (saunatonttu).

Maan haltija 
Certain "haltiat", known as "maan haltija" (literally "tutelary of land"), guarded the property of an individual, including their house and livestock. Votive offerings would be given to these haltijas at a shrine, as thanks for the help given and also to prevent the haltija from causing harm.

Sometimes haltijas of certain families and farms acted against other families and their farms by stealing their wealth or making the animals infertile, for instance.

Many local haltijas were believed to have originally been the sacred spirits of ancestors. In some cases a haltija was the first inhabitant of house. Sometimes while making a new house a local spirit of nature could be "employed" to work as a maan haltija.

Väki and haltija
Different elements and environments had their own haltijas. Haltijas were grouped into types or races called väki. "Väki" has multiple connected meanings of "strength", "force", "throng", "military troop"; in the magical context, it referred ambiguously to magical strength and numbers. There were, for instance, different väki of water, forests, and graveyards.

Väkis could become angry if people acted in a disrespectful manner in their area. For example, cursing close to water made the väki of water angry. When angry, väkis could cause diseases and other misfortune to befall the human victim. Some väkis were always angry, like the väki of fire, explaining why every time you touch fire it burns, no matter how respectful you are around it.

Each tribe of väkis belonged to specific environments and if they were misplaced, problems occurred. For example, most väkis were misplaced if they attached to a human being, and they made the human being ill because they were in the wrong place. Illnesses were removed by sending väkis back to their right places. Shamans who cured diseases were returning the cosmic balance. For example, it was believed that on contact with the ground, as in falling on one's face, diseases could spread to the human, caused by the "väki" of the earth. Similarly, löyly (sauna steam) was believed to contain a väki spirit (löylyn henki), which could cause open wounds to get infected.

According to the concept of väki being divided in two (into power and folk of haltijas) the ancient Finns believed that the world was totally animistic in that no force of nature or intelligent life existed without väkis or haltijas. In other words, nothing happened in the universe without it being caused by a group of spirits. Even a person's soul consisted of many spirits.

Soul, death, and the afterlife

Soul

The pagan Finnish belief about the soul dictated that the human soul is composed of three different parts: henki, luonto and itse. Each of the three were autonomous beings on their own. Similar beliefs about multiple autonomous souls are found amongst other peoples speaking Uralic languages, such as the Khanty and Mansi, who believe in two souls: the shadow and the lili (löyly).

Henki (translated as "life", "breath" or "spirit", sometimes also referred to as löyly) was a person's life force, which presented itself as breathing, the beating of one's heart and the warmth of their body. Henki was received prior to birth and it left at the moment of death. The word hengetön (lit. "one without henki") can be used as a synonym for dead in the Finnish language even now.

Luonto (translated as "nature") was a guardian spirit or protector. Luonto has also been referred to as the haltija of a person. A strong willed, artistic or otherwise talented person was believed to have a strong haltija who granted them good luck and skills to complete their tasks well. A weak luonto could be strengthened by various spells and rituals. Luonto could leave a person's body without the person dying, but its lengthened absence would cause problems, such as alcoholism and other addictions. Unlike henki, luonto was not received prior to birth but instead either at the time of getting the first teeth or being given a name. A newborn child was thus considered to be particularly vulnerable. These concepts share similar basics with the idea of hamr (life force) and Hamingja (luck) in Norse belief.

Itse was a spirit received at the time of birth or a few days after. It was believed to define one's personality and receiving itse made one a person. In modern-day Finnish the word itse means "self", but in old days itse was different from one's self, minuus. Like luonto, itse could leave one's body without the person dying but long absence would cause illnesses and misery. Depressions, for instance, was seen as a result of having lost one's itse. If a person was diagnosed to be itsetön or luonnoton (without one's itse or without one's luonto), a shaman or a sage could try locating the missing part of the soul and bring it back. Although itse and luonto were usually lost after a traumatising event, it was possible to purposefully separate one's itse from their body. This was required if a missing part of the soul needed to be found. Itse could also leave the body to appear as an etiäinen (a sort of false arrival apparition). At the time of a person's death their itse joined the other deceased of the family or, in some cases, stayed among the living as a ghost; much like the Norse concept of Fylgja (follower).

Burial
In some traditions, it was a habit to pause at a half-way point while transporting the dead body, from the dwelling to the graveyard. Here, a karsikko-marking was made on a big pine tree. The marking was for people to remember the person; and in the event that the spirit were to awaken and try to make its way back home from the graveyard, it would see its own karsikko-marking, then realize that it is dead and instead try to find the path to the spirit realm. A forest with karsikko-marked trees was a kind of supernatural barrier between dwellings of the living and the burial grounds.

After a person died there was a transitional period of thirty to forty days while their soul searched Tuonela, the land of dead, and tried to find their place there. During this period, the soul could visit its living relatives either as a ghost or in the form of an animal.

The soul visited relatives especially if it was unhappy. To please an unhappy soul, one would show respect by not speaking ill of the deceased or by having a sacrifice in 
the spirit's name.

After this transitional period, the soul moved permanently into Tuonela. However, the soul could still come back if it were unhappy, or if it were asked to return by its relatives who needed help.

Some souls were not able to settle down or were not welcomed in Tuonela, and they continued haunting, i.e. bastard children who were killed and buried outside a cemetery usually ended up as permanent haunters of some place, typically screaming in terror, until someone digs up their bodies, blesses them, and buries them in a graveyard.

Ancestor veneration
People were afraid of ghosts, but spirits of ancestors could also help their living relatives, and they were asked to help. A shaman could be sent to Tuonela to ask for knowledge of spirits or even to take a spirit to the world of living as luonto. A Spirit of the dead had to be honoured by giving him/her sacrifices. Places where sacrifices were given to ancestors were called Hiisi ( = sacred forest, also a kind of open air temple, often included the Offering-stone, uhrikivi, collective monument for the dead of the family). Christianity held hiisi to be evil creatures and places. The old sacred places were often desecrated by being used as the building sites for the churches of the new religion, and the old sacred trees were hacked down.

Afterlife

The Finns believed in a place of afterlife called Tuonela, or sometimes Manala. In most traditions it was situated underground or at the bottom of a lake, though sometimes it was said to exist on the other side of a dark river. Tuonela was ruled over by the god Tuoni, and his wife, the goddess Tuonetar.

Tuonela was a dark and lifeless place, where the dead were in a state of eternal sleep. Shamans were sometimes able to reach the spirits of their dead ancestors by traveling to Tuonela in a state of trance created by rituals. He had to make his way over the Tuonela river by tricking the ferryman. While in Tuonela, the shaman had to be careful not to get caught: the living were not welcome there. Shamans who were caught could end up decaying in the stomach of a giant pikefish with no hope of returning to normal life. If the shaman died during the trance ritual, it was believed that he had been caught by the guards at Tuonela.

Mythology 

The pagan Finns had many myths about their gods and their great heroes. Because they lived in a non-literate society, the stories were taught orally as folklore, and they were not written down. Finnish mythology survived Christianisation by being told as myths. Many of these myths were later written down in the 19th century as the Kalevala, which was created to be a national epic of Finland by Elias Lönnrot.

Sacred animals

Because of the very nature of life in prehistoric, ancient, and medieval Finland, the Finns relied heavily on hunting for survival. As such the animals that they hunted became vital to their survival, and they were treated with respect.

The bear was considered sacred in the pre-Christian beliefs of the Finns. As noted by DuBois, "the Finno-Ugric ceremonial bear hunt sought to remove a fierce competitor from the local environment, while winning its power for the hunter." After the flesh was eaten, the bones were buried, and the skull placed on a venerated pine tree known as kallohonka. Peijaiset are also an important part of other Uralic cultures, such as the Khanty-Mansi.

In Karelia and Eastern Finland, before going hunting, hunters would pray to the emuu, the ancestral mother of the animal species being hunted, for help. The word emuu is Karelian and is related to the word emo "animal mother". Each species had its own emuu.

From ancient drawings, petroglyphs, it is clear that the elk was a very important animal. Elk is also very important to other peoples of the region, such as the Komis, who depict their sky god Jenmar as half-human and half-elk. It appears much more than bears do, and it is theorised that the bear was such a holy animal that it was forbidden to depict it. Also, the bear's name was almost forbidden to say, so many euphemisms were developed. The most usual Finnish word for bear in modern language, karhu, is just one of the many euphemisms, and it means "rough fur." Among the many names of bear otso is probably the original "real" name, as suggested by the wide spread of the word otso and related words among many of the Uralic languages. Many euphemisms for bear are local.

Many water birds were holy for Finns and other Baltic Finns. They were often depicted on petroglyphs. It was believed that if you killed a water bird, you would die soon after. The holiest water bird was the swan. With its long neck, it could look to all the levels of the world, including Tuonela, the land of the dead. Birds are found often in Uralic mythology. For example, there are many stories about a bird creating the world. A very common Uralic myth is where a hunter (Finnish Lemminkäinen, Mari Salij) travels to the underworld in order to marry a woman and comes across the primordial waterbird on the river of the underworld, the hunter shoots the waterbird with his bow, but the waterbird escapes and terrible things happen to the hunter. In many traditions it was believed that the world was created by the egg of a bird. In other traditions it was believed that the world was created on mud that bird took in its beak while diving.

In Karelia it was believed that a bird brings the soul to a newborn baby, and that the same bird takes the soul with it when that person dies. This soul-carrying bird was called sielulintu, "soul-bird". In some traditions people carried artifacts depicting their sielulintu. Sielulintu was believed to guard their souls while they slept. After the person died, the artifact-bird was inserted to sit on the cross at the person's grave. Such crosses with soul birds still exist in graveyards in Karelia. This is one example how Christian and Pagan beliefs still existed side by side hundreds of years after the Christianisation of the Finnish and Karelian people.

Shamanism 

It is believed by some scholars that shamanism played a big part in Finnish paganism, as it did (and still does) in the Siberian paganism to the east of Finland. A tietäjä (shaman, literally "one who knows") is a wise and respected person in the community, believed to have a special relationship with the spirit world. Shamans go into a trance to commune with spirits and ancestors or to take a journey into the spirit realm. In trances shamans may ask their ancestors or various nature spirits for guidance. They believe that nature has the answers to all questions. Tietäjäs or healers were typically men of high standing in the local society, often landed peasants; it was thought that wealth was evidence of magic powers.

Among the Finns' western neighbours, the Norse of Scandinavia, it was a common belief that the Finns were wizards. In the Norse sagas, inclusion of a Finnish element almost always signifies a supernatural aspect to the story. Finns were also called Kvens. However, "Finn" in some Norse sagas could also mean the Sami and not the Finns. In the iron age, the nomadic Sami people inhabited much of the same lands as Finns, and the Sami warlocks (Lapin noita) were a parallel and coexisting tradition. Sami warlocks inherited their position and traditions through a paternal line.

According to tales, foreign seafarers bought ropes tied with three knots from Finns. By opening one knot, a seaman could raise a wind to make his ship go faster. However, opening all three knots would raise a storm. Finnish wizards were known and feared by neighbouring peoples around the Baltic Sea.

Christianisation

Christian missionaries entered Finland in the 11th century. The native pagan religion still persisted, until Christianity was strengthened under Swedish influence in the 12th century. In the 13th century a crusade was launched against the last pagans in the country by Birger Jarl.

Songs and incantations

In the seventeenth to nineteenth centuries, Finnish folk magic often incorporated chanted or sung incantations. These incantations might bring healing or presage a tietäjä's ecstatic trance. In the twentieth century, an American researcher in Minnesota reported sung charms for summoning cattle, avoiding hiccups, and avoiding cold based on interviews with a Finnish immigrant.

Finnish Neopaganism

In the 20th century, with the rise of the Neopagan movement across the world, Finnish Neopaganism arose as a reconstructed form of the old religion. It is mainly practiced in Finland where it has had an official minority religion status since 2013. Finnish neopaganism accounts for a relatively small percentage of the population, the majority being members of the state Lutheran Church or professing no religion. In 2020, the registered religious community of Finnish neopaganism, Karhun kansa (The Folk of the Bear), had approximately 80 members.

See also 
 Estonian mythology
 Finnic deities

References

External links

 
Karelian-Finnish folklore